Royal Air Force Swinderby or more simply RAF Swinderby was a Royal Air Force station airfield opened in 1940, one of the last of the stations completed under the RAF's expansion plans started in the 1930s. It was built near the village of Swinderby, Lincolnshire just off the south east side of the A46 (the Fosse Way) between Newark-on-Trent, Nottinghamshire and Lincoln, Lincolnshire, England.

The station closed on 17 December 1993.

The Explorer Scouts unit based in the village of Swinderby, is named EGXS, a reference to the ICAO location indicator of the airfield. Their badge includes the layout of Swinderby's runways.

History

Under the command of No. 1 Group RAF, Swinderby came under the auspices of RAF Bomber Command and housed several bomber squadrons, among others No. 300 Polish Bomber Squadron and No. 301 Polish Bomber Squadron, initially flying the Fairey Battle, then Vickers Wellington. Other squadrons operated aircraft, such as the Handley Page Hampden.

On 16 July 1941 the newly created Polish Air Force Colour was presented to General Sikorski, the Polish Commander-in-Chief, in the presence of many dignitaries, in a solemn ceremony at RAF Swinderby. It was then handed to No. 300 Bomber Squadron, the senior Polish Squadron in Britain, resident at Swinderby. Thereafter it was rotated to other Polish Squadrons every 3 months.

In the 1950s and early 1960s it was the home of No. 8 Flying Training School RAF, converting trainee pilots to de Havilland Vampires. In 1956 it hosted a brief experiment to keep all the flying training to wings stage straight through on one base. This was abandoned after a month due to the obvious danger of collisions in the circuit between the Vampires and the much slower piston engined Percival Provost basic trainers. In 1964 RAF Swinderby changed its role to that of recruit training when No.7 School of Recruit Training, formerly at RAF Bridgnorth, opened at RAF Swinderby. It became responsible for the basic training of all male enlisted personnel prior to their trade training, in August 1964 intake 7/46 was the first pass out parade at RAF Swinderby. Females were still trained at RAF Hereford in 1976 and in 1982 the very first integrated Flight (i.e. male and female recruits) passed out in November at RAF Swinderby. In July 1993 No.1 Squadron 6 Flight was the final pass out parade before the RAF School of Recruit Training moved to RAF Halton.

A live LP recording of a passing out parade was made in 1973, featuring the Midland Band of the Royal Air Force. It included all the commands and sounds of the parade.

RAF Swinderby closed on 17 December 1993, with the Joint Elementary Flying Training Squadron having previously moved to RAF Topcliffe in North Yorkshire.

Current use
In 1995 the station was put up for sale, where the land was purchased by Cemex for commercial mining. However, Cemex continued to rent the land to International Antiques & Collectors Fairs five times a year for the Swinderby Antiques Fair.

In 2013 the hangars and the air traffic control tower remained in evidence along with acres of concrete runways and taxiways but most of the other buildings on the technical site have been demolished. In 2014 only 2 hangars remained, but the control tower was demolished.

The domestic site has been developed as the new village of Witham St Hughs with only the former Officer's Married Quarters and Airmen's Married Quarters remaining. The new village hall has an information board giving the history of RAF Swinderby.

On 10 May 2014 a memorial was dedicated to all those Servicemen and Servicewomen who served at RAF Swinderby from 1940 to 1993. It is situated by the modern village hall, adjacent to the information board and the bench "Remembering No. 300 & No. 301 Polish Squadrons who served with the Royal Air Force at RAF Swinderby during WW II".

Squadrons

References
Arkady Fiedler: 303 SQUADRON – The Legendary Battle of Britain Fighter Squadron (Aquila Polonica (U.S.) Ltd, Los Angeles, California, U.S.A., 2010).

Citations

Bibliography

External links

Official RAF History of Swinderby
Photos of the base today
More Photos
Photos of airfield buildings in 2009
 RAF Swinderby at the International Bomber Command Centre Digital Archive.

1940 establishments in the United Kingdom
1994 disestablishments in the United Kingdom
Military installations closed in 1994
Education in Lincolnshire
North Kesteven District
Royal Air Force stations in Lincolnshire
Royal Air Force stations of World War II in the United Kingdom
Training establishments of the Royal Air Force